Pieter-Jan Monteyne (born 1 January 1983, in Roeselare) is a retired Belgian football left back.

Personal
He is the older brother of Martijn Monteyne.

Honours

Club
Beerschot A.C.
 Belgian Cup: 2004–05

References

External links
Weltfussball 
Guardian Football

1983 births
Living people
Belgian footballers
K.S.V. Roeselare players
Beerschot A.C. players
R.A.E.C. Mons players
Royal Excel Mouscron players
Oud-Heverlee Leuven players
Belgian Pro League players
Challenger Pro League players
Association football defenders
People from Roeselare
Footballers from West Flanders